Graham Ian Hume (born 23 November 1990) is a South African born cricketer who plays for the Ireland cricket team. He made his international debut for Ireland in July 2022.

Career
He was included in the KwaZulu-Natal Inland squad for the 2016 Africa T20 Cup. He was the leading wicket-taker in the 2017–18 Sunfoil 3-Day Cup for KwaZulu-Natal Inland, with 40 dismissals in ten matches.

In May 2019, he played for the North West Warriors in the 2019 Inter-Provincial Cup in Ireland. In February 2021, Hume was named in the Ireland Wolves' squad for their tour to Bangladesh. In May 2022, Cricket Ireland awarded Hume with a nine-month contract.

In June 2022, Hulme was named in Ireland's One Day International (ODI) squad for their series against New Zealand. He made his ODI debut on 15 July 2022, for Ireland against New Zealand. In July 2022, Hume was added to Ireland's Twenty20 International (T20I) squad for their two-match series against South Africa in Bristol. Later the same month, Hand was also named in Ireland's T20I squads for their home series against Afghanistan.

International career
Hume made his T20I debut on 12 August 2022, against Afghanistan. He made his ODI debut against Zimbabwe on 21 January 2023. Hume was named in Ireland's Test squad for their tours of Bangladesh in March 2023 and Sri Lanka in April 2023. He was also named in the T20I and ODI squads for the tours.

References

External links
 

1990 births
Living people
South African cricketers
Irish cricketers
Ireland One Day International cricketers
Ireland Twenty20 International cricketers
Gauteng cricketers
KwaZulu-Natal Inland cricketers
Dolphins cricketers
North West Warriors cricketers
Cricketers from Johannesburg